The Albacete Provincial Museum (Museo Provincial de Albacete) is a museum of archeology and fine art located in Albacete, Spain. The museum has existed in various incarnations since 1927, and settled in its present building in Abelardo Sánchez Park in 1978. Its exhibits emphasize the development of regional civilization and art, and the museum is divided into subsections for archeology, fine arts, and ethnology. It was declared Bien de Interés Cultural in 1962.

The Joaquín Sánchez Jiménez Archaeology Museum houses a notable collection of Roman and pre-Roman artifacts. Local Paleolithic and Neolithic items are shown, as well as Roman art and tools. Iberian sculpture is featured as well.

The Benjamín Palencia fine arts section emphasizes 20th century works, and includes many pieces by local contemporary artists.

Artifacts 
 Sphinx of Haches
 Lion of Bienservida

See also 
 List of museums in Spain

References

External links
Museum hours, info, and further links

Art museums and galleries in Spain
Bien de Interés Cultural landmarks in the Province of Albacete
Museums established in 1927
Museums in Castilla–La Mancha
Archaeological museums in Spain
Buildings and structures in Albacete
1927 establishments in Spain